Science Progress may refer:

 Science Progress, a scientific journal (1894–1898)
 Science Progress in the Twentieth Century, a scientific journal published by John Murray, London (1906–1916)
 Science Progress, a scientific journal (1916–1919)
 Science Progress in the Twentieth Century, a quarterly journal of scientific work & thought (1919–1933)
 Science Progress, a scientific journal published by Science Reviews Ltd., London (1933–2017), ISSNs 0036-8504, 2047-7163
 Science Progress, a scientific journal meanwhile published by SAGE Publishing, ISSNs 0036-8504, 2047-7163
 Science Progress (Center for American Progress), an internet publication since 2007

See also
 Scientific progress

 8th century in science

 11th century in science

 19th century in science
 20th century in science